United Nations Security Council resolution 1382, adopted unanimously on 29 November 2001, after recalling all previous resolutions on Iraq, including resolutions 986 (1995), 1284 (1999), 1352 (2001) and 1360 (2001) concerning the Oil-for-Food Programme, the Council extended provisions relating to the export of Iraqi petroleum or petroleum products in return for humanitarian aid for a further 180 days.

The Security Council was convinced of the need for a temporary measure to provide humanitarian assistance to the Iraqi people until the Iraqi government fulfilled the provisions of Resolution 687 (1991) and had distributed aid throughout the country equally.

Acting under Chapter VII of the United Nations Charter, the Council extended the Oil-for-Food Programme for 180 days beginning at 00:01 EST on 1 December 2001. It reaffirmed the obligation of all countries of the arms embargo on Iraq and other resources unauthorised by the council. It also stressed the need for Iraq to co-operate with previous Security Council resolutions and the need for a comprehensive settlement on the basis of the resolutions. The resolution also appealed for all countries to co-operate in the submission of applications and issue of export licences so that humanitarian aid could reach the Iraqi population as soon as possible.

Additionally under Resolution 1382, the Council adopted a proposed Goods Review List (contained in Annex I of the resolution) for implementation from 30 May 2002. Items on the list would be subject to procedures contained in Annex II of the resolution and approval from the Sanctions Committee and United Nations Monitoring, Verification and Inspection Commission after an assessment had been made that such goods would not be used for military purposes.

The adoption of the resolution represented a closer alignment of Russian policy towards the United States after the latter pledged to review sanctions against Iraq.

See also
 Foreign relations of Iraq
 Gulf War
 Invasion of Kuwait
 Iraq disarmament timeline 1990–2003
 Iraq and weapons of mass destruction
 Iraq sanctions
 List of United Nations Security Council Resolutions 1301 to 1400 (2000–2002)

References

External links
 
Text of the Resolution at undocs.org

 1382
2001 in Iraq
 1382
Iraq and weapons of mass destruction
November 2001 events